Han Xinyun and Sun Shengnan were the defending champions, having won the event in 2012, but Han chose not to defend her title. Sun partnered up with Hsu Chieh-yu, but withdrew in the semifinals.

Kanae Hisami and Mari Tanaka won the title, defeating Rika Fujiwara and Akiko Omae in the final, 6–4, 7–6(7–2).

Seeds

Draw

References 
 Draw

Kurume Best Amenity Cup - Doubles
Kurume Best Amenity Cup